Polish National Committee (Komitet Narodowy Polski) can refer to several Polish organizations:

Historical
Polish National Committee (1831–1832) in Paris
Polish National Committee (1848) during the Spring of Nations
Polish National Committee (1834–1838) in the United States
Polish National Committee (1914–1917) pro-Russian
Polish National Committee (1917–1919) in Paris

Modern
Polish National Committee (2004), minor political coalition

See also
Polish Committee of National Liberation